Tony Lynn Brackens, Jr. (born December 26, 1974) is a former American college and professional football player who was a defensive end in the National Football League (NFL) for nine seasons.  He played college football for the University of Texas, and earned All-American honors.  A second-round pick in the 1996 NFL Draft, he played for the Jacksonville Jaguars for his entire pro football career.

Early years
Brackens was born and raised in Fairfield, Texas.  He attended Fairfield High School, and played for the Fairfield Eagles high school football team.

College career
Brackens attended the University of Texas at Austin, where he played for the Texas Longhorns football team from 1992 to 1995.  He developed a reputation as a ferocious hitter as a defensive end.  As senior in 1995, he was recognized as a consensus first-team All-American and was also a first-team All-Southwest Conference selection.  He finished his career ranked eighth on the Longhorns' all-time list with 24 sacks.  He was also a key contributor to the 1995 Longhorns team that went 10-1 and won the Southwest Conference and gained a berth in the 1996 Sugar Bowl against the Virginia Tech Hokies.

Professional career
He was taken in the second round of the 1996 NFL draft by the Jacksonville Jaguars, for whom he played his entire professional career. His lone Pro Bowl appearance came in 2000, after the 1999 season in which he had 12 sacks and 8 forced fumbles. As of 2011, he held the all-time Jacksonville Jaguars records for several categories: sacks (55), fumble recoveries (13) and forced fumbles (28). He is also the leading tackler (all-time) among Jaguars defensive ends.

He was released in 2004, after a series of troubling leg injuries and operations. He ultimately decided to retire, saying that recent rule changes had made it impossible for him to play his style of football. He said, "Mentally and physically, I thought I could probably still do it, but I didn’t want to put up with all the rule changes. All the stuff they’re doing to players takes the fun out of the game." The moment in which he was let go was captured by NFL Films in "Jacksonville Jaguars: Inside the Training Camp", an unofficial version of the Hard Knocks TV series.

NFL statistics

Regular season

Postseason

External links

1974 births
Living people
All-American college football players
American Conference Pro Bowl players
American football defensive ends
Jacksonville Jaguars players
Texas Longhorns football players
People from Fairfield, Texas
Ed Block Courage Award recipients